The Sessions were a Canadian dance-rock band from Vancouver, British Columbia. The band won the world's largest battle of the bands, Emergenza, in 2006.

History
The Sessions formed in 2005. Members included bassist Tobias Jesso Jr. drummer Martin Kottmeier, guitarist Tristan Norton and singer Josh Helgason. 

In 2006, The Sessions joined the Emergenza band competition, along with 7,631 bands from 16 countries.  The band won a competition in Calgary, and then moved on to the national competition in Montreal. The Sessions won first place at the Emergenza finals in Rothenburg, Germany.

The band recorded a six-song EP with producer Bob Rock, entitled The Sessions Is Listed as In a Relationship. The album received a mixture of reviews. Two songs from the album, "My Love" and "18 Candles", were featured in the mountain biking film Seasons by The Collective. The beginning of "18 Candles" is used as some of the Question and Answer music in "Pawn Stars".

The Sessions toured the western United States in February 2008, hitting Popscene in San Francisco as well as dates in Las Vegas, Hollywood, and San Diego.  Helgason left the band in March 2008 and co-formed Stars Blvd soon after. The band members did some session work in California, including recording with singer Melissa Cavatti.

After break-up
Band members Tristan Norton and Martin Kottmeier have since co-formed electronic music DJ/production duo Young Bombs. 

Tobias Jesso Jr. started a career as a singer-songwriter.

Members

Martin Robert Kottmeier - drums, vocals
Joshua Helgason - vocals, synthesizer
Tristan Norton - guitar, vocals, keyboards
Tobias Jesso Jr. - bass, vocals

References

External links
 'Noisy Crumb' - A journalist's blog on experiencing The Sessions in Germany
 "Spirit of Music Profile: The Sessions". Spirit of Vancouver website, By Graham Dalik (October 12, 2007) Archived at the Wayback machine
 The Sessions on Last.fm
 Popscene SF events schedule circa February 2008
 Emergenza Article
 "More Canadian Sessions". Whistler Pique interview by Nicole Fitzgerald, December 8, 2006

Musical groups established in 2005
Musical groups disestablished in 2008
Musical groups from Vancouver
Canadian indie rock groups
2005 establishments in British Columbia
2008 disestablishments in British Columbia